Richard James Johnson (born September 16, 1963) is a former American football cornerback who played eight seasons in the National Football League (NFL) for the Houston Oilers. He was an All-American and All-Big Ten cornerback in 1984 while at the University of Wisconsin.

External links
NFL.com player page

1963 births
Living people
People from Harvey, Illinois
American football cornerbacks
Houston Oilers players
Wisconsin Badgers football players